Middle Qingliu Road (Chinese: 青六中路) is a metro station on Line 7 and Line 8 of the Hangzhou Metro in China. Opened on 30 December 2020, it is located in the Qiantang District of Hangzhou.

Gallery

References 

Hangzhou Metro stations
Railway stations in China opened in 2020